is the 16th single by Japanese idol girl group Nogizaka46. It was released on November 9, 2016. The song became number-one on the weekly Oricon Singles Chart, with 827,717 copies sold. It was also number-one on the Billboard Japan Hot 100. This is the group's first Million single certified by RIAJ.

Release 
The single has 5 versions. Type-A, Type-B, Type-C, Type-D and a regular edition. On October 20, 2016, the title song was aired for the first time on the Nogizaka46's All Night Nippon. In this radio show, one of the first generation member Nanami Hashimoto announced that she would retire not only from the group but also from the entertainment industry on her birthday next year. She performed the center position for the first and the last time , and her solo song Naimono Nedari is included in the regular edition.

Music video 
The music video for the title song was taken in Shizuoka and Yamanashi Prefecture. The filming was interrupted because a typhoon directly hit the location. It was directed by Shō Yanagisawa, also known as the director of Shiseido and Pokémon Go commercial film.

Track listing 
All lyrics written by Yasushi Akimoto.

Regular Edition

Type-A

Type-B

Type-C

Type-D

Participating members

Sayonara no Imi

3rd Row: Himeka Nakamoto, Sayuri Inoue, Mai Shinuchi, Reika Sakurai, Rina Ikoma, Minami Hoshino, Hinako Kitano, Marika Itō

2nd Row: Yumi Wakatsuki, Sayuri Matsumura, Miona Hori, Asuka Saitō, Misa Etō, Manatsu Akimoto

1st Row: Kazumi Takayama, Nanase Nishino, Nanami Hashimoto , Mai Shiraishi, Erika Ikuta

Chart and certifications

Weekly charts

Year-end charts

Certifications

References

Further reading

External links 
 Discography  on Nogizaka46 Official Website
 

2016 singles
2016 songs
Japanese-language songs
Nogizaka46 songs
Oricon Weekly number-one singles
Billboard Japan Hot 100 number-one singles
Songs with lyrics by Yasushi Akimoto
Songs written by Katsuhiko Sugiyama